The 2000 NCAA Division III football season, part of the college football season organized by the NCAA at the Division III level in the United States, began in August 2000, and concluded with the NCAA Division III Football Championship, also known as the Stagg Bowl, in December 2000 at Salem Football Stadium in Salem, Virginia. The Mount Union Purple Raiders won their fifth Division III championship by defeating the Saint John's (MN) Johnnies, 10−7.

The Gagliardi Trophy, given to the most outstanding player in Division III football, was awarded to Chad Johnson, quarterback from Pacific Lutheran.

Conference standings

Conference champions

Postseason
The 2000 NCAA Division III Football Championship playoffs were the 28th annual single-elimination tournament to determine the national champion of men's NCAA Division III college football. The championship Stagg Bowl game was held at Salem Football Stadium in Salem, Virginia for the eighth time. This was the second bracket to feature 28 teams since last expanding in 1999.

Playoff bracket

* Overtime

Final AFCA Top 25 Poll 

Others receiving votes: Wesley, 86; Hobart, 78; Thomas More, 76; Montclair St., 74; Hope, 65; Rowan, 44; Aurora, 34; Ripon, 20; Emory & Henry, 20; Middlebury, 14; Amherst, 11; Bridgewater St., 9; Wheaton, 8; Lycoming, 4; Augustana, 2.

Awards 
Gagliardi Trophy: Chad Johnson, Pacific Lutheran

AFCA Coach of the Year: Larry Kehres, Mount Union

AFCA Regional Coach of the Year: Region 1: Mike DeLong, Springfield Region 2: Bill Zwaan, Widener Region 3: Pete Fredenburg, Mary Hardin-Baylor Region 4: Larry Kehres, Mount Union Region 5: Ed Meierkort, Wisconsin-Stout

See also
2000 NCAA Division I-A football season
2000 NCAA Division I-AA football season
2000 NCAA Division II football season

References